The New South Wales Office of Local Government, a former agency from 1993 until 2019 of the Department of Planning and Environment in the Government of New South Wales, was responsible for administering legislation in relation to local government areas in New South Wales.

Up until its abolition in April 2019, the office was led by its Acting Chief Executive, Mr Tim Hurst, who reported to the Minister for Local Government.

Following the 2019 state election the office was abolished and its functions assumed by the newly formed Department of Planning, Industry and Environment with effect from 1 July 2019.

Divisional responsibilities
The role of the office included preparing legislation, providing advice and information to the State Government and local councils, regulating financial management and monitoring financial reporting practices of councils, and improving local government performance through provision of standards and guidelines and conducting reviews and investigations (often called Section 430 investigations).

As part of a drive to locate government offices in regional areas, the office's head office was in the regional town of Nowra on the South Coast, but an office in Castlereagh Street in Sydney CBD also provides Divisional services.

See also

 Local government areas of New South Wales
 List of Ministers for Local Government in the state of New South Wales

References

External links
Office of Local Government web site

Local Government
Local government in New South Wales
1983 establishments in Australia
2019 disestablishments in Australia
Government agencies disestablished in 2019
Government agencies established in 1983